Insulanoplectron is a monotypic genus of weta that contains the species Insulanoplectron spinosum. I spinosum or the Snares Island weta, is a cave weta in the family Rhaphidophoridae, endemic to the Snares and Antipodes islands of New Zealand.

References 
 Royal Society of New Zealand 
 Peripatus

Cave weta
Monotypic insect genera
Rhaphidophoridae